David Joshua Rubin (born in June 1976) is an American conservative political commentator. He is the creator and host of The Rubin Report, a political talk show on YouTube and on the network BlazeTV. Launched in 2013, his show was originally part of TYT Network, until he left in 2015, in part due to widening ideological differences. Previously, Rubin hosted LGBT-themed talk shows, including The Ben and Dave Show from 2007 to 2008 and The Six Pack from 2009 to 2012, both of which he co-hosted with Ben Harvey. Rubin has written two books.

Rubin originally considered himself to be a progressive while part of The Young Turks. However, Rubin has written that his views began to change after witnessing progressive commentator and former colleague Cenk Uygur's criticisms of Fox News commentator David Webb, Ben Affleck's confrontation with Bill Maher and Sam Harris over their views on Islam, and the political left's response to the Charlie Hebdo shooting. Rubin then described himself as a classical liberal, but has since stated that he has become a conservative. Rubin has become a staunch critic of progressivism, the political left, and the Democratic Party. In 2022, Rubin registered as a Republican in Florida.

Early life 
Rubin was born in June 26, 1976 in Brooklyn, New York City. He grew up in a "fairly secular Jewish household on Long Island". He spent his adolescence in Syosset, New York, and then he resided on the Upper West Side of Manhattan for thirteen years. He attended Binghamton University, where he graduated with a bachelor's degree in political science. In 1997, he also spent a semester at Ben-Gurion University of the Negev in Beersheba, Israel.

Career

Comedy 
In 1998, Rubin started his career in comedy doing stand-up and attending open-mics in New York City. In 1999, he became an intern at The Daily Show with Jon Stewart.

In 2000, Rubin continued his career at the New York City–based Comedy Cellar.  Later that year he joined with other Comedy Cellar comedians to create a public-access television series, a news program parody called The Anti-Show which was secretly filmed at NBC Studios in 30 Rockefeller Plaza.

In 2002, he co-founded several New York City–based comedy clubs, including Joe Franklin's Comedy Club and The Comedy Company in Times Square, where he continued to do stand-up until 2007.

He was the host of two podcasts, Hot Gay Comics and The Ben and Dave Show, which were turned into a television series on the here! television network. In May 2009, Rubin co-created and co-hosted the podcast The Six Pack. From October 2011 to December 2012, The Six Pack was on Sirius XM Radio as a live talk show.

Political commentary 
While a part of Sirius XM, Rubin created his own account on YouTube called "Rubin Report" in early September 2012. In January 2013, Rubin joined The Young Turks, where he hosted the show The Rubin Report. He moved from New York City to Los Angeles, California.

On March 1, 2015, The Young Turks YouTube channel announced that Rubin would be moving to the media company RYOT. Shortly after, Larry King's Ora TV picked up the show which debuted on September 9, 2015. He left Ora TV in 2016, opting to run The Rubin Report independently. The Rubin Report has an affiliation with the libertarian Institute for Humane Studies, a Koch family foundations–funded organization which sponsors an episode of his show per month.

Rubin frequently appears as a speaker at events hosted by Turning Point USA, a conservative student organization. Rubin has been a podcast guest on The Joe Rogan Experience, Coffee with Scott Adams, and The Ben Shapiro Show. In 2017, he starred in a video by the conservative media company PragerU titled "Why I Left the Left". Rubin's book Don't Burn This Book: Thinking for Yourself in an Age of Unreason was published in April 2020 by Sentinel. It made The New York Times Best Seller list, but was critically panned.

In December 2021, Rubin sold his Los Angeles house and announced that he was moving to Miami, Florida. In his announcement, he criticized California Governor Gavin Newsom as an "unbearable tyrant who dared to extend his emergency powers and then immediately take a $200,000 vacation." He also cited "high crime", "high taxes", "vaccine passports and mask conformity" as reasons for his decisions to move from California.

The Rubin Report 
In 2015 Rubin launched a The Rubin Report. On his show Rubin interviews and conversations with journalists, activists, authors, comedians, and professors. Topics discussed on his show include Freedom of speech, Political correctness, Foreign policy, and Religion. Guests on his show include Sam Harris, Ben Shapiro, Larry Elder, Steven Crowder, Ayaan Hirsi Ali, Douglas Murray, John McCain, and others. Rubin has also hosted more controversial figures on his show including Lauren Southern, Mike Cernovich, and Milo Yiannopoulos.

Until late 2018, Rubins show received much of his funding through Patreon, a crowdfunding site on which Rubin said he received over $10,000 per month before deletion. Rubin and Jordan Peterson announced their intent to leave the platform following Sargon of Akkad's ban, which they described as an assault on free speech. In a video shortly thereafter, the two announced their interest in developing an independent, free speech oriented crowdfunding site. Peterson started Thinkspot, and Rubin co-created locals.com. By May 2019, The Rubin Report YouTube channel had 200 million views. In 2019, The Rubin Report became available on BlazeTV, a conservative subscription video service run by Glenn Beck.

Political views

Political ideology 
Rubin initially described himself as a classical liberal due to holding more conservative and libertarian views than most modern liberals. In December 2021, Rubin wrote an article for Newsweek where he argues that classical liberals and libertarians should vote for the Republican Party. In this article, he states that one of the reasons he voted for Trump in 2020 is that Rand Paul became one of Trump's biggest allies in the Senate, and Paul is someone "who didn't want to get into those wars, who wanted to reduce taxes, wanted to kick power back to the states" (all ideas Rubin agrees with).

In a 2017 interview with Reason, Rubin stated that he originally characterized himself as on the progressive left but stopped calling himself a progressive in response to Oppression Olympics in which "victimhood is the highest virtue" and what he regarded as the left's rejection of freedom of speech. Rubin has since described himself as a conservative, stating in 2021: "For me to tell you that I'm not a conservative at this point doesn't really make sense." Rubin formerly favoured several liberal views such supporting same-sex marriage and criminal justice reform, and marijuana legalization. He has, however, characterized progressivism as a "mental disorder".

Candidates and elections 
Rubin voted for Barack Obama in the 2008 United States presidential election and 2012 United States presidential election. Rubin also voted for Bill Clinton.

Ahead of the 2016 United States Presidential election, Rubin declined to endorse Hillary Clinton or Donald Trump and instead voted for Libertarian Party candidate Gary Johnson. In an interview with Glenn Beck, he retrospectively stated that he chose not to vote for Trump as he was uncertain about how Trump would govern the United States.In July 2017, Rubin criticized Trump's use of executive orders when asked about Trump policies with which he disagreed.In October 2020, Rubin said he had "been a lifelong Democrat", but would be voting for a Republican president for the first time and endorsed Donald Trump for a second term in the 2020 United States Presidential Election. Rubin subsequently elaborated that while he didn't agree with everything Trump had done, he had changed his mind on the president and would vote for Trump on the basis of his opposition to the "woke left" and critical race theory in American institutions.

Identity politics 
Rubin is opposed to identity politics. In a 2019 interview with Sky News, he stated, "Whether you're gay or straight or black or white or female or trans, those things are actually completely irrelevant other than your thoughts; your thoughts and actions are what matters." He has also stated that "the left is obsessed with the color of your skin" and that there is presently "no significant racism in the United States."

Gender and sexuality 
Rubin is gay and supports same-sex marriage. However, he has also said that he would not take legal action against a Christian baker if one refused to make a wedding cake for his wedding. In 2022, Rubin spoke out against rainbow logos for gay pride month. His Twitter account was suspended after he retweeted a tweet in which Jordan Peterson misgendered actor Elliot Page.

Law enforcement 
In 2022, Rubin criticized Democrat politicians for supporting the defund the police movement and accused of them of "demonizing" law enforcement. Rubin supported an effort to fire Los Angeles district attorney George Gascón. Rubin supports criminal justice reform and reforming drug sentencing. Rubin opposes the death penalty.

Israel 
Rubin is a supporter of Israel. While still part of the progressive Young Turks network, Rubin believed that the network "whitewashed crucial details" about the conduct of Hamas during the 2014 Gaza War. In an interview with The Jerusalem Post, Rubin stated, "The future of the [Democratic Party] seems to be this radical socialist base that believes for one group to succeed, another has to fail." He went on to state that this is why progressive Democrats like Ilhan Omar, Rashida Tlaib, and Linda Sarsour (who he thinks are "true antisemites") have an anti-Israel and anti-Jewish view.

Rubin stated in an interview with Alan Mendoza on J-TV, "First off, this idea … that anti-Zionism somehow is not antisemitism is crazy." Rubin went on to say that there are many Christian- and Muslim-majority countries and that "there's one tiny Jewish country again with … seven million people or so, twenty percent of whom … are Arab and have [… the exact same rights as the Israelis. Not to say there aren't some problems in Israel. Of course, there are. But … it is by far the most tolerant society in the entire Middle East."

Intellectual dark web 
Rubin is a member of the intellectual dark web, an informal group which speaks out against political correctness, cancel culture and identity politics. Other members of the group include Eric Weinstein, Jordan Peterson and Ben Shapiro.

Criticism 
Prior to Rubin’s shift to conservative politics, critics have accused Rubin of providing a platform for individuals considered political extremists, such as self-described New Right figure Paul Joseph Watson, Great Replacement conspiracy theorist Lauren Southern, white nationalist Stefan Molyneux, and far-right activist Tommy Robinson.

A 2018 report from Data & Society described Rubin as part of a network on YouTube that amplified far-right politics. The report cited as an example an interview that Rubin conducted with Stefan Molyneux in which Rubin asked Molyneux to elaborate on his views that races have different average IQ test results and that these differences are genetic. The report held that Rubin did not challenge Molyneux in any substantial way, concluding, "By letting him speak without providing a legitimate and robust counterargument, Rubin provides a free platform for white supremacist ideology on his channel." In response to the report, Rubin tweeted, "wanna explain to me how gay married, pro choice, pro-pot, against death penalty, for reforming prisons/drug sentencing, is part of reactionary right?" and "(As you and rest of mainstream slide into irrelevancy you did get the 'underestimated forces' part right, though.)".

According to Anthony Fisher, a journalist at The Daily Beast, Rubin has implied or stated that Paul Joseph Watson, Stefan Molyneux and Mike Cernovich are part of "a new political center" and, in a 2016 livestream, said "the alt-right as a shitposting, fun, call out the bullshit, mock-the-power thing is amazing", adding that "there's nothing funny coming out on the left now".

Sam Harris has criticized Rubin for not devoting enough of his show to criticizing Trumpism.

Personal life 
Rubin publicly came out as gay in 2006, which he has referred to as his "defining moment". In December 2014, he became engaged to producer David Janet. The couple married on August 27, 2015. On March 16, 2022, Rubin and Janet announced that they are expecting two babies by surrogates. The first, a son named Justin Jordan, was born in August. Their second son was born in October.

He once described himself as an agnostic or an atheist, but he said that he was no longer an atheist in December 2019.

In 2021, Rubin announced his intention to relocate from Los Angeles to Florida and moved to the greater Miami area.

Bibliography 
 Don't Burn This Book: Thinking for Yourself in an Age of Unreason (2020).  McClelland & Stewart. .
 Don't Burn This Country: Surviving and Thriving in Our Woke Dystopia (2022).  Sentinel. .

References

External links 

 
 

1976 births
Living people
American libertarians
Jewish American male comedians
American podcasters
American political commentators
American stand-up comedians
American YouTubers
American Zionists
Binghamton University alumni
Blaze Media people
Commentary YouTubers
Florida Republicans
Former atheists and agnostics
Gay comedians
Gay entertainers
LGBT conservatism in the United States
LGBT Jews
LGBT YouTubers
People from Brooklyn
People from Syosset, New York
People from the Upper West Side
People from Sherman Oaks, Los Angeles
Syosset High School alumni
Television personalities from Los Angeles
The Young Turks people
21st-century American comedians
News YouTubers
20th-century LGBT people
21st-century LGBT people
American LGBT comedians